Junior Colson (born December 6, 2002) is an American football linebacker for the Michigan Wolverines. He was born in Haiti and moved to the United States at age nine. As a sophomore, he led the 2022 Michigan Wolverines football team in tackles and was selected by the conference coaches as a second-team linebacker on the 2022 All-Big Ten Conference football team.

Early years
Colson was born in Mirebalais, Haiti. His father died when he was seven years old, and he was placed in an orphanage in Port-au-Prince operated by his uncle. At age eight, he met Americans Steve and Melanie Colson who visited Haiti on a church mission after the 2010 Haiti earthquake. He was adopted by the Colsons and, after a lengthy adoption and immigration process, moved to Tennessee at age nine in May 2012. He recalled that, on arriving at the airport in the United States, "The first thing I saw in America was a Michigan hat. That's what all of my family members were wearing, they're big Michigan fans."

Colson grew up speaking Haitian Creole and learned English only after moving to Tennessee. He also grew up playing soccer and took up American football in Tennessee. He attended Ravenwood High School in Brentwood, Tennessee, where he played football on defense and as a kick returner. He was rated as one of the top players in Tennessee and one of the top linebacker recruits.

University of Michigan
Colson met Michigan Wolverines football coach Jim Harbaugh at a camp in Kentucky and was offered a scholarship to play football. He enrolled at Michigan in 2021 and started seven games as a true freshman for the 2021 Michigan Wolverines football team, totaled 61 tackles (fourth most on the team), and was selected as a freshman All-American.

As a sophomore, Colson led the 2022 Michigan Wolverines football team with 80 tackles.  At the end of the season, he was selected by the conference coaches as a second-team linebacker on the All-Big Ten team.

References

External links
 Big Ten Network video feature on Junior Colson
 Michigan Wolverines bio

2002 births
Living people
American football linebackers
Haitian emigrants to the United States
Michigan Wolverines football players
People from Brentwood, Tennessee
People from Centre (department)
Players of American football from Tennessee